Aruba competed at the 2019 Pan American Games in Lima, Peru from July 26 to August 11, 2019.

The Aruban team consisted of 21 athletes (consisting of 12 males and nine females).

During the opening ceremony of the games, sailor Mack van den Eerenbeemt carried the flag of the country as part of the parade of nations. Mack van den Eerenbeemt would later go on to win Aruba's first ever Pan American Games medal, a bronze in the rs:x event.

Competitors
The following is the list of number of competitors (per gender) participating at the games per sport/discipline.

Medalists
The following competitors from Aruba won medals at the games. In the by discipline sections below, medalists' names are bolded.

Artistic swimming

Aruba qualified a duet of two athletes.

Women

Athletics (track and field)

Aruba qualified one male athlete.

Key
Note–Ranks given for track events are for the entire round

Men
Field event

Bowling

Aruba qualified two female bowlers through the 2018 South American Games. Aruba later qualified two men by finishing among the top five at the PABCON Champion of Champions.

Cycling

Aruba qualified two cyclists in the BMX discipline (one per gender). Aruba was later reallocated two quotas in road cycling (two per gender). Aruba therefore qualified four cyclists (two men and two women).

BMX

Road

Track
Hillard Cijntje, who qualified in road cycling, also contested the ominium event in track cycling.

Men

Judo

Aruba qualified one female judoka.

Women

Karate

Aruba qualified one male karateka. Jolano Lindelauf originally qualified under the Curacao flag, but since the island is not a member of Panamsports, Lindelauf chose to compete for Aruba.

Kumite
Men

Sailing

Aruba qualified one male sailor in the rs:x event, after Mack Van Den Eerenbeemt won the 2018 South American Championships. Aruba later received a universality spot in the men's laser event. After the close of entries, Aruba was awarded an additional universality spot in the women's laser radial event. Therefore, in total Aruba qualified three sailors (two men and one woman).

Key
DNS= Did not start

Shooting

Aruba qualified one female sport pistol shooter. However, as part of the qualification system, countries are able to switch quotas among events (within the same discipline). Therefore Aruba entered a male competitor. 

Men

Swimming

Aruba qualified three swimmers (two men and one woman).

Taekwondo

Aruba received one wildcard in the men's +80 kg event.

Kyorugi
Men

See also
Aruba at the 2019 Parapan American Games

References

Nations at the 2019 Pan American Games
2019
2019 in Aruban sport